Wislizenia is a genus of flowering plants containing three recognized species native to the southwestern United States and northern Mexico. Common names include spectacle fruit and jackass clover. Like genus Cleome and several relatives, Wislizenia has traditionally been included in the caper family, Capparaceae, but has more recently been moved to the new family Cleomaceae.

Wislizenia is an erect, branching herb which forms a low, scrubby bush. It extends many dense racemes topped with densely packed flowers. The flowers are mustard-yellow and bear plentiful thready stamens which form a cloud about the inflorescence. The distinctive fruit is a conjoined pair of hard, tan nutlets containing the seeds. The foliage of this plant is toxic, but it is used readily by honeybees, making it a good honey plant.

The genus is named for botanist Friedrich Adolph Wislizenus, 1810–1889. He was born in Königsee, Germany, but came to the United States in 1837. He spent much time exploring the southwestern United States and northwestern Mexico, writing memoirs on the botany and human customs of the region.

Species
Three species are currently recognized, although some authors have suggested considering them as subspecies:

Wislizenia californica Greene, San Joaquin Valley, California
Wislizenia palmeri A. Gray, Sonora, Baja California, and Baja California Sur, as well as from San Diego and Riverside Counties in California
Wislizenia refracta Engelm., Chihuahua, Sonora and southwestern United States

References

External links
Jepson Manual Treatment

Cleomaceae
Brassicales genera
Flora of Mexico
Flora of the United States